Orrs Creek (also known as Orr Creek) is a  westward-flowing stream in Mendocino County, California that empties into Russian River near the city of Ukiah, California. The stream serves as a greenway for  recreation and wildlife.

References 

Tributaries of the Russian River (California)
Rivers of Mendocino County, California